Rivey Hill is a hill overlooking Linton in Cambridgeshire, England. At  it is the highest point for several miles around. The highest point is on private land but a bridleway from Linton crosses near the top. A watertower on the hill identifies it when seen from a distance. 

The ascent of the hill is the start of a circular walk, detailed in Jarrold's Walks in Cambridgeshire, which goes north from the top to a Roman Road, follows this over the 

See also 
 Army Manoeuvres of 1912

Hills of Cambridgeshire
Linton, Cambridgeshire